The MAMA Award for Best Male Group (남자 그룹상) is an award presented annually by CJ E&M Pictures (Mnet). Mnet is also the one who choose which group will to this category as well as other categories in MAMA.

It was first awarded at the 1st Mnet Asian Music Awards ceremony held in 1999; the band H.O.T. won the award for their song "I Yah!", and it is given in honor for the male group with the most artistic achievement in the music industry.

Winners and nominees

1990s

2000s

2010s

2020s

 Each year is linked to the article about the Mnet Asian Music Awards held that year.

Multiple awards
4 wins
 BTS
 Shinhwa

3 wins
 Big Bang
 Exo

2 wins
 2PM 
 Wanna One

Notes

References

External links
 Mnet Asian Music Awards official website

MAMA Awards